Manesse may refer to:

 Manesse (family), Patrician family in Zurich
 Manesse Verlag, Swiss publishing house

People 
 Gaspard Manesse (born 1975), French actor and composer
  (born 1941), French actress

See also 
 Codex Manesse, 14th-century manuscript in codex form